is an Echizen Railway Mikuni Awara Line railway station located in the city of Sakai, Fukui Prefecture, Japan.

Lines

Station layout
The station consists of one side platform serving a single bi-directional track. The station is unattended.

Adjacent stations

History
On September 1, 1942 the Keifuku Electric Railway merged with Mikuni Awara Electric Railway. Operations were halted from June 25, 2001. The station reopened on August 10, 2003 as an Echizen Railway station. On March 25, 2017 the station was renamed as Shimohyogo Kofuku Station.

Passenger statistics
In fiscal 2015, the station was used by an average of 72 passengers daily (boarding passengers only).

Surrounding area
 The station is surrounded by residences and fields. Fukui Prefectural Route 102 lies to the south.
 Sakai City Shimo-Hyōgo Elementary School

See also
 List of railway stations in Japan

References

External links

  

Railway stations in Fukui Prefecture
Railway stations in Japan opened in 1928
Mikuni Awara Line
Sakai, Fukui